Shur Gesht (also Romanized as Shūr Gesht and Shūr Kesht) is a village in Taghenkoh-e Jonubi Rural District, Taghenkoh District, Firuzeh County, Razavi Khorasan Province, Iran. At the 2006 census, its population was 1,214, in 335 families.

References 

Populated places in Firuzeh County